The 83rd season of the Campeonato Gaúcho kicked off on February 1, 2003 and ended on July 3, 2003. Eighteen teams participated. Holders Internacional beat 15 de Novembro in the finals, winning their 35th title. São Luiz and Palmeirense were relegated.

Participating teams

System 
The championship would have four stages:

 Group A: The four teams in the Série A and Série B (Internacional, Grêmio, Caxias and Juventude) played each other in a double round-robin system; the two best teams qualified into the Semifinals.
 Group B: The fourteen teams that didn't participate in the Série A or Série B played against each other in a double round-robin system. After 26 rounds, the two best teams qualified to the Semifinals and the bottom two teams were relegated.
 Semifinals: The four remaining teams played in a two matches to define the teams that would qualify to the Finals. In case of ties, group leaders would advance.
 Finals: Semifinals winners played in two matches to define the Champions. The team with best overall record played the second leg at home.

Championship

Group A

Group B

Semifinals

Finals

References 

Campeonato Gaúcho seasons
Gaúcho